The 1995 Peach Bowl featured the Georgia Bulldogs and Virginia Cavaliers.

Georgia fell behind to the Cavaliers, 24–6, before rallying to tie the game at 27 late in the fourth quarter. Virginia clinched the victory when Demetrius "Pete" Allen returned a kickoff 83 yards for a touchdown to secure the 34–27 win with under a minute remaining. The Bulldogs lost despite a total offense edge of 525 to 256 yards.

Scoring summary
First Quarter
Virginia: Tiki Barber 1-yard touchdown run (Rafael Garcia kick), 10:37
Virginia: Kevin Brooks 5-yard touchdown run (Garcia kick), 4:09
Georgia: Kanon Parkman 36-yard field goal, 1:00

Second Quarter
Georgia: Parkman 37-yard field goal, 14:52
Virginia: Garcia 36-yard field goal, 9:42
Virginia: Pete Allen 82-yard touchdown pass from Mike Groh (Garcia kick), 2:34
Georgia: Hines Ward 1-yard touchdown run (Brice Hunter pass from Ward), 0:19

Third Quarter
Georgia: Brower 20-yard touchdown reception (Brice Hunter pass), 8:01
Virginia: Garcia 36-yard field goal, 1:58

Fourth Quarter
Georgia: Parkman 42-yard field goal, 14:43
Georgia: Jason Ferguson 10-yard fumble return for touchdown (Parkman kick), 1:09
Virginia: Allen 83-yard kickoff return for touchdown (Garcia kick) 0:57

Statistics

References

Peach Bowl
Peach Bowl
Georgia Bulldogs football bowl games
Virginia Cavaliers football bowl games
December 1995 sports events in the United States
1995 in sports in Georgia (U.S. state)
1995 in Atlanta